Eduardo Rodríguez is a Venezuelan film director and screenwriter whose professional career in the United States began after Bob Weinstein, founder of Dimension Films, offered Eduardo a contract to direct three feature films in 2002. Details of his unusual deal were featured on the front page of Variety on April 17, 2002, as well in articles from Entertainment Weekly (May 3, 2002) and Premiere Magazine (August 2002). Eduardo was also anointed a member of Entertainment Weekly's 2002 "It List" of the 100 most creative people in entertainment.

He made the 15-minute 35mm short Daughter as his thesis project at Florida State University in Tallahassee, FL, where he received his M.F.A. in August 2001. After graduation, Eduardo toured the festival circuit where Daughter was screened and honored at more than twenty national and international film festivals. To top it all off, for one of the few times in the history of the Cannes Film Festival, his student film Daughter was selected to compete in the professional short film category at the 55th annual celebration of this international event.

Before moving to Florida, Eduardo studied communications at Universidad Catolica Andres Bello in his native Venezuela and was an editor for commercials and TV shows for several years.

In 2005, Eduardo completed his first feature film, entitled Curandero, which was produced by Dimension Films and written and executive produced by Robert Rodriguez. The film had its US premiere in 2005 at the Screamfest Film Festival.

In 2006, he directed the reshoot of several scenes for The Messengers, which was released by Screen Gems on the first quarter of 2007.

In 2008, Eduardo wrote and directed a Web series called Blood Cell which was originally produced by 60 Frames and was later bought by Warner Bros. Interactive.

In 2009, Eduardo directed an episode of the NBC horror anthology Fear Itself, entitled The Circle which was included in the Fear Itself: The Complete First Season DVD.

In 2010, he directed an episode for America's Most Wanted entitled Jose Corona.

In 2011, Eduardo directed two movies consecutively for After Dark Films and Silver Pictures. Stash House with Dolph Lundgren and El Gringo with Scott Adkins and Christian Slater and were released simultaneously theatrically and on VOD on May 11, 2012.

In 2012, Eduardo helmed Fright Night 2: New Blood, starring Jaime Murray, for Twentieth Century Fox Home Entertainment. The movie was released on October 1, 2013.

In 2016, he directed the short film Inwards, starring Johnny Whitworth, which was released on December that year.

In 2020, You're Not Alone Eduardo's indie directorial debut, starring Katia Winter, was released on VOD where available.

In 2021, the horror film The Darkness Of The Road, which he wrote and directed, was released on DVD and VOD where available.

Filmography

Feature films

Short films

Series

References

External links
 

Living people
Venezuelan film directors
Venezuelan screenwriters
Year of birth missing (living people)